Shahada is a 2010 German drama film directed by Burhan Qurbani. It was nominated for the Golden Bear at the 60th Berlin International Film Festival. The film narrates the fates of three German-born Muslims in Berlin that collide as they struggle to find middle ground between faith and modern life in contemporary Western society.

Cast
 Carlo Ljubek as Ismail
 Jeremias Acheampong as Sammi
 Maryam Zaree as Maryam
 Sergej Moya as Daniel
 Marija Škaričić as Leyla
 Vivian Kanner as Ärztin
 Anne Ratte-Polle as Sarah
 Alina Manoukian as Arzu
 Nora Rim Abdel-Maksoud as Renan
 Yolette Thomas as Amira
 Ali Murtaza as Ali
 Vedat Erincin as Vedat
 Julia Graf
 Jacob Jensen as Türsteher
 Jürgen Nafti as Markthallenbesitzer
 Niklas Gerroldt

References

External links
 

2010 films
2010 drama films
German drama films
2010s German-language films
Films set in Berlin
2010s German films